"Buried" is the tenth episode of the fifth season of the American television drama series Breaking Bad, and the 56th overall episode of the series. Written by Thomas Schnauz and directed by Michelle MacLaren, it aired on AMC in the United States and Canada on August 18, 2013.

Plot 
Late at night, an elderly man, collecting the money which Jesse Pinkman has thrown away, discovers him parked in a playground and absentmindedly spinning on a roundabout. Meanwhile, after his confrontation with Hank Schrader, Walter White frantically tries calling Skyler White, but cannot get through as Hank is already on the phone with her. Walt rushes to the car wash, but Skyler has already left to meet Hank at a diner. Believing Skyler to be a victim, Hank unwittingly reveals that Walt's cancer has returned and unsuccessfully tries enlisting her help in building a case against Walt. Skyler, however, suspects that Hank has made it a personal mission to convict Walt and worries that Hank may not truly have her best interests at heart. She then panics and leaves the diner.

Walt goes to Saul Goodman's office, angered that Skyler went to Hank before talking to him. When Saul asks whether Walt has considered having Hank killed, Walt admonishes him, reminding him that Hank is family. Rushing to hide his money, Walt has Patrick Kuby and Huell Babineaux deliver it to him in seven container drums. He then drives to the Tohajiilee Indian Reservation and spends the day burying it. Meanwhile, Marie Schrader confronts Skyler about Walt's criminality. After learning that Skyler knew about Walt’s activities before Hank was shot, Marie slaps her, despite a tearful Skyler's attempts to apologize. Marie tries to leave with Walt and Skyler’s infant daughter Holly, but Hank enters the house and tells Marie to give Holly back. In the car, Marie tells Hank that he "has to get" Walt.

Walt returns home late and posts a lottery ticket on the refrigerator door; its numbers correspond to the GPS coordinates of the buried drums. Unresponsive to Skyler's questioning, an exhausted Walt collapses. When he awakens, Walt offers to surrender himself on the condition that the money be kept for their children. Instead, Skyler tells Walt that they should keep quiet, noting that Hank has no evidence. Elsewhere, Lydia Rodarte-Quayle confronts Declan, now cooking and supplying meth, at his desert lab. She is critical of the poor standards and working conditions, but Declan rejects her suggestion to hire Todd, Walt's former protégé. At Lydia's behest, Todd and his uncle Jack arrive and massacre Declan and his men before taking over the operation.

Hank will not approach the DEA until he has reliable evidence to apprehend Walt, as he believes his career will end if he reveals his unsubstantiated suspicion that Heisenberg is actually his brother-in-law. Marie insists on putting the DEA on the case, concerned over how they may respond if they learn that Hank hid his discovery. Hank returns to work, where Agent Steve Gomez reveals that Jesse is detained and under questioning. Hank, realizing Jesse's connection to Walt, keeps his discovery secret and asks for time alone with Jesse.

Production 
Walt's burial scene is on Navajo land, the same spot where Walt and Jesse did their first batch in the RV. The latitude and longitude displayed on Walt's GPS receiver and on the lottery ticket are in fact the coordinates of the Albuquerque Studios location where Breaking Bad is filmed.<ref name="coord">{{cite web | url=https://www.wired.com/underwire/2013/08/breaking-bad-lottery-numbers/ | title=What's the Meaning of Breaking Bad'''s Lost-esque Lottery Numbers? | work=Wired.com | date=August 19, 2013 | access-date=April 1, 2016 | author=Watercutter, Angela | archive-date=March 24, 2014 | archive-url=https://web.archive.org/web/20140324162502/http://www.wired.com/underwire/2013/08/breaking-bad-lottery-numbers | url-status=live }}</ref>

 Dedication 
The episode is dedicated to Thomas Schnauz Sr., father of the writer of this episode.

 Music 
The song played over Walt's digging is Chancha Vía Circuito's remix of Argentine José Larralde's "Quimey Neuquén".

 Reception 

 Viewership 
The episode was watched by 4.77 million people on its original broadcast, down from the series-high 5.92 million of the previous episode.

 Reviews 
The episode received overwhelmingly positive reviews from critics. TVLine gave Anna Gunn an honorable mention in their "Performer of the Week" feature for her performance in this episode.

In 2019 The Ringer ranked "Buried" 52nd out of the 62 total Breaking Bad episodes.

 Accolades 
Thomas Schnauz was nominated for the Writers Guild of America Award for Television: Episodic Drama for this episode.

 Notes 

 References 

 External links 
"Buried" at the official Breaking Bad'' site

Breaking Bad (season 5) episodes
2013 American television episodes